Security and Human Rights is a magazine that was formerly known as the Helsinki Monitor. It was established in 1990 and obtained its current name in 2008. The journal is published by Martinus Nijhoff Publishers on behalf of the Netherlands Helsinki Committee and is a legacy of the Helsinki Accords, which during the Cold War were intended to provide a bridge between Eastern and Western Europe on the basis of common principles and co-operative security.

Security and Human Rights is published quarterly and covers issues related to the work and principles of the Organization for Security and Co-operation in Europe.

References

External links
 
 Netherlands Helsinki Committee

Brill Publishers academic journals
English-language magazines
Magazines established in 1990
Mass media in Leiden
Political magazines published in the Netherlands
Quarterly magazines published in the Netherlands